Cendrino Quincy Misidjan (born 29 August 1988) is a Dutch footballer of Surinamese descent who plays as a left back for TEC in the Dutch Tweede Divisie.

Career
He formerly played for Stormvogels Telstar, Almere City, FC Oss, Go Ahead Eagles, Sparta Rotterdam and Bulgarian side CSKA Sofia. During his stay in CSKA, he found it hard to establish himself as an integral part of the squad and only made one appearance in a 4–0 win for CSKA against Haskovo at Bulgarian Army Stadium and was later on released by the club in the winter break. Later he joined FC Emmen, where he made 7 appearances. After he played for Ermis Aradippou. In the 2016–17 season he played for De Treffers in which he made 7 appearances and scored twice, and then moved to play for VVV-Venlo.

References

External links
 

1988 births
Living people
Surinamese emigrants to the Netherlands
Dutch footballers
Dutch expatriate footballers
SC Telstar players
Almere City FC players
TOP Oss players
Go Ahead Eagles players
Sparta Rotterdam players
PFC CSKA Sofia players
FC Emmen players
Ermis Aradippou FC players
VVV-Venlo players
FC Dordrecht players
De Treffers players
SV Spakenburg players
Eerste Divisie players
Tweede Divisie players
First Professional Football League (Bulgaria) players
Cypriot First Division players
Expatriate footballers in Bulgaria
Expatriate footballers in Cyprus
Sportspeople from Paramaribo
Association football fullbacks
SV TEC players
Dutch expatriate sportspeople in Bulgaria
Dutch expatriate sportspeople in Cyprus
RKC Waalwijk players